Iñaki Lafuente Sancha (born 24 January 1976) is a Spanish former professional footballer who played as a goalkeeper.

He appeared in 146 La Liga games over ten seasons, mainly with Athletic Bilbao. He also represented Espanyol and Sporting de Gijón in the competition.

Club career
Born in Barakaldo, Biscay, Lafuente was a graduate of Lezama, the famed Athletic Bilbao youth academy. He made his debut with the first team in 1999–2000 after serving two loans at modest Basque neighbours, adding another with Elche CF three years later. After replacing Imanol Etxeberria he competed with Dani Aranzubia for first-choice status in several La Liga seasons, appearing in 36 games in 2000–01 and adding 30 the following campaign.

For 2007–08, Lafuente was loaned to RCD Espanyol as Gorka Iraizoz was sold in the opposite direction. At his new club he backed up Carlos Kameni, and when the Cameroonian left for the 2008 Africa Cup of Nations he became the starter, but retired injured in just his second appearance.

In July 2008, Lafuente returned to Athletic Bilbao, being only third-choice. On 13 January 2009, due to Sporting de Gijón starter Iván Cuéllar's serious ankle injury, coincidentally in a match against the former, he was loaned to the Asturias side until the end of the campaign. In his first start, on the 25th, they were crushed 5–1 at Getafe CF.

Lafuente was released by Athletic in the summer of 2009, ending a 16-year relationship. In late July, the 33-year-old moved to CD Numancia (recently relegated to the Segunda División), being used mostly as a backup during his two-year spell and retiring subsequently.

References

External links

1976 births
Living people
Spanish footballers
Footballers from Barakaldo
Association football goalkeepers
La Liga players
Segunda División players
Segunda División B players
Tercera División players
Bilbao Athletic footballers
CD Getxo players
Sestao Sport Club footballers
Elche CF players
Athletic Bilbao footballers
RCD Espanyol footballers
Sporting de Gijón players
CD Numancia players
Basque Country international footballers